Louis Hasselmans (25 July 1878 – 27 December 1957) was a French cellist and conductor.

Biography 
The son of harpist Alphonse Hasselmans, Louis Hasselmans studied the cello with Jules Desart at the Conservatoire de Paris. He obtained a First prize in 1893. He worked with Albert Lavignac, Benjamin Godard and Jules Massenet.

Between 1904 and 1909, he was a member of the Capet Quartet. He made his debut as a conductor with the Orchestre Lamoureux. He latter conducted the Opéra-Comique (1909–1911 - 1919–1922), the  Montreal orchestra, the "Concerts classiques de Marseille" (1911–1913) and the Civic Opera House of Chicago (1918–1919). From 1921 to 1936, he conducted the Metropolitan Opera of New York. From 1936 to 1948, he taught at the School of Music at Louisiana State University.

Louis Hasselmans was the dedicatee of the Cello sonata No 1 by Gabriel Fauré.

Louis Hasselmans married the American mezzo-soprano Minnie Egener (1881–1938).

Bibliography

External links 
 Sketch of Louis Hasselmans on Gallica
 Louis Hasselmans papers
 Louis Hasselmans portrait 
 Louis Hasselmans on LSU
 Discography on Discogs
 Louis Hasselmans in Déodat de Sévérac: la musique et les lettres
 Carmen: Final Scene - Ponselle, Maison, cond. Hasselmans (Live, Boston 1936) on YouTube 

French classical cellists
French conductors (music)
French male conductors (music)
Conservatoire de Paris alumni
1878 births
Musicians from Paris
1957 deaths